Linda Nosková was the defending champion but chose not to participate. She instead entered in the women's singles event, where she lost to Emma Raducanu in the first round.

Lucie Havlíčková won the title, defeating Solana Sierra in the final, 6–3, 6–3.

Seeds

Draw

Finals

Top half

Section 1

Section 2

Bottom half

Section 3

Section 4

Qualifying

Seeds

Qualifiers

Draw

First qualifier

Second qualifier

Third qualifier

Fourth qualifier

Fifth qualifier

Sixth qualifier

Seventh qualifier

Eighth qualifier

References

External links 
Draw at rolandgarros.com
Draw at ITFtennis.com

Girls' Singles
French Open, 2022 Girls' Singles